Ukraine: A History is a 1988 book on the history of Ukraine written by Orest Subtelny, a professor of history and political science at York University, Toronto, Ontario, Canada. It is a comprehensive survey of the history of the geographical area encompassed by what is modern-day Ukraine. Updated editions have been published in 1994 to include new material on the dissolution of the Soviet Union, 2000 to include Ukraine's first decade of independence, and 2009 to include the Orange Revolution and the effects of globalization on Ukraine.

Overview
The history of Ukraine is divided into five parts in the book and presented chronologically, beginning with an introductory chapter on the prehistory of Ukraine titled The Earliest Times, followed by Part One: Kievan Rus', Part Two: The Polish-Lithuanian Period, Part Three: The Cossack Era, Part Four: Ukraine under Imperial Rule, and Part Five: Twentieth-Century Ukraine.

Reviews
The book has received positive reviews from the Journal of Ukrainian Studies, Canadian Book Review Annual, Midwest Book Review, and World Affairs Report.

Editions in Canada
 1988, Toronto, Ontario, Canada, University of Toronto Press 1st ed.
 1994, Toronto, Ontario, Canada, University of Toronto Press 2nd ed.
 2000, Toronto, Ontario, Canada, University of Toronto Press 3rd ed.
 2009, Toronto, Ontario, Canada, University of Toronto Press 4th ed.

Editions in Ukraine 

 1991, Kyiv, Ukraine, translation from English by Y. Shevchuk. Lybid (Publishing House)    1st.Ukr. ed.  
 1992, Kyiv, Ukraine, translation from English by Y. Shevchuk. Lybid (Publishing House)   2nd.Ukr. ed.  
 1993, Kyiv, Ukraine, translation from English by Y. Shevchuk. Lybid (Publishing House)   3rd ed., Revised and supplemented

First reviews in Ukrainian 

 in Ukrainian: Peter Yakovenko. Orest Subtelny. Ukraine: A History. K.: Lybid, 1991 (review of 1 ed.), Political Science Readings, 1991, № 1, p. 306–308
 in Ukrainian: Peter Yakovenko. A story we do not know: Orest Subtelny. Ukraine: A  History. K .: Lybid, 1993. (Review of 3 editions). Viche journal Verkhovna Rada, 1994, № 3, p. 151–154

See also
 Bibliography of Ukrainian history

References

External links
 University of Toronto Press Publishing page for Ukraine: A History, 4th Edition

History books about Ukraine
1988 non-fiction books
1994 non-fiction books
2000 non-fiction books
2009 non-fiction books
20th-century history books
21st-century history books
History books about the Soviet Union
History books about the Polish–Lithuanian Commonwealth
University of Toronto Press books